Idriss Carlos Kameni (born 18 February 1984) is a Cameroonian professional footballer who plays for Andorran club UE Santa Coloma as a goalkeeper.

He spent the vast majority of his career in Spain, mainly with Espanyol for whom he appeared in 229 official games over eight La Liga seasons. He also competed professionally in France and Turkey.

A Cameroonian international before he was 20, Kameni represented the country in two World Cups and six Africa Cup of Nations tournaments.

Club career

France
Born in Douala, Kameni was first spotted when, aged 16, he became the youngest footballer to win an Olympic gold medal, in 2000. This earned him a transfer to French club Le Havre AC but he was unable to break into the first team, and remained a reserve for the duration of his spell, also being loaned to AS Saint-Étienne and also failing to gain any playing time there. In 2001 he was linked with a move to Juventus FC, but nothing came of it.

Kameni almost joined Premier League's Wolverhampton Wanderers on a season-long loan for the 2003–04 season, but the deal collapsed after he was not granted a United Kingdom work permit.

Espanyol
20-year-old Kameni signed with Spanish side RCD Espanyol in July 2004 for US$600,000, and became first choice in his second year, winning the Copa del Rey as backup to Gorka Iraizoz, who started in La Liga. In the 2006–07 campaign, the opposite: Kameni was the starter, and Iraizoz was picked for the Catalans' UEFA Cup runner-up run. Early in 2006, the club suspended two fans for racist abuse towards the player.

In 2008–09, a tense season for Espanyol, which ranked in the bottom three for a lengthy period, Kameni had two incidents: first, he had a near-physical confrontation with a fan (who first insulted the player) after a training session in January, then fought with teammate Grégory Béranger again in training, in May. He still featured in 37 out of 38 league games, being essential to his team's survival, and also broke his compatriot Thomas N'Kono's record of minutes without conceding a goal, setting it at 498.

Málaga
After two more seasons as starter, Kameni was demoted to third choice for 2011–12, with Argentine Mauricio Pochettino still as Espanyol's manager. On 13 January 2012 he moved to Málaga CF, making his league debut on 25 March after replacing injured Willy Caballero during the first half of a 2–1 away win against his former team, and keeping a clean sheet during his time on the pitch.

Kameni became the starter after Caballero left for Manchester City. On 26 September 2015, in a game where Real Madrid registered 31 shots, he put on a Player of the match performance in a 0–0 draw at the Santiago Bernabéu Stadium. The following matchday, he became the first club goalkeeper to provide an assist in the Spanish top flight, as Charles scored the second of his three goals in a 3–1 home victory over Real Sociedad.

On 2 March 2016, Kameni scored a bizarre own goal in a 1–2 home loss to Valencia CF. Three days later, at Deportivo de La Coruña, he had to be replaced shortly before half-time due to injury, as the match went on to end 3–3.

On 19 November 2016, Kameni denied hosts FC Barcelona on several occasions, in a 0–0 draw.

Fenerbahçe
In July 2017, Kameni signed a three-year deal with Turkish club Fenerbahçe SK. He made his Süper Lig debut on 17 September, being booked late into a 4–1 away defeat of Alanyaspor. 

Kameni left by mutual consent on 28 August 2019.

Later career
In April 2021, the 37-year-old Kameni came out of retirement to join Alex Song at Djiboutian club Arta/Solar7.

International career
A Cameroonian international since the age of 17, Kameni was part of the national team squads at the 2002, 2004, 2006 and 2008 Africa Cup of Nations, starting in all but the first. He was the first-choice goalkeeper as his country finished as runners-up at the 2003 FIFA Confederations Cup.

In 2002, aged 18, Kameni was picked for Cameroon's squad of 23 at the 2002 FIFA World Cup. He was named Best African Goalkeeper for 2006–07, after being runner-up in the previous season.

Kameni was also chosen for the 2010 World Cup in South Africa, and was expected to start by many observers. However, he ended up on the bench as coach Paul Le Guen preferred Souleymanou Hamidou over him, and the national side was the first team to be eliminated from the tournament after losing all three group matches.

On 27 October 2015, more than two years after being left out of consideration for selection for "trying to orchestrate disorder", Kameni was called by new manager Volker Finke for a game against Niger for the 2018 World Cup qualifiers.

Personal life
Kameni's older brother, Mathurin, was also a footballer and a goalkeeper.

Honours

Club
Espanyol
Copa del Rey: 2005–06
UEFA Cup runner-up: 2006–07

Arta/Solar7
Djibouti Premier League: 2021–22
Djibouti Cup: 2022

National
Cameroon U23
Summer Olympics: 2000

Cameroon
Africa Cup of Nations: 2002
FIFA Confederations Cup runner-up: 2003

Individual
Málaga Player of the Year: 2014–15

References

External links

1984 births
Living people
Cameroonian footballers
Footballers from Douala
Association football goalkeepers
Ligue 1 players
Le Havre AC players
AS Saint-Étienne players
La Liga players
RCD Espanyol footballers
Málaga CF players
Süper Lig players
Fenerbahçe S.K. footballers
Djibouti Premier League players
AS Arta/Solar7 players
Primera Divisió players
UE Santa Coloma players
Cameroon under-20 international footballers
Cameroon international footballers
2001 FIFA Confederations Cup players
2002 FIFA World Cup players
2003 FIFA Confederations Cup players
2010 FIFA World Cup players
2002 African Cup of Nations players
2004 African Cup of Nations players
2006 Africa Cup of Nations players
2008 Africa Cup of Nations players
2010 Africa Cup of Nations players
2019 Africa Cup of Nations players
Olympic footballers of Cameroon
Footballers at the 2000 Summer Olympics
Medalists at the 2000 Summer Olympics
Olympic medalists in football
Olympic gold medalists for Cameroon
Cameroonian expatriate footballers
Expatriate footballers in France
Expatriate footballers in Spain
Expatriate footballers in Turkey
Expatriate footballers in Djibouti
Expatriate footballers in Andorra
Cameroonian expatriate sportspeople in France
Cameroonian expatriate sportspeople in Spain
Cameroonian expatriate sportspeople in Turkey
Cameroonian expatriate sportspeople in Djibouti